In archaeological excavation, a plan is a drawn record of features and artifacts in the horizontal plane.

Overview 
Archaeological plan can either take the form of 
 a "multi context" plan, which is drawn with many contexts on it to show relationships between these features as part of some phase, or 
 alternatively a single context plan with a single feature is drawn . 

Excavated features are drawn in three dimensions with the help of drawing conventions such as hachures. Single context planning developed by the Museum of London has become the professional norm. The basic advantage of single context planning is context plans draw on "transparent perma-trace paper" can be overlaid for re-interpretation at a later date. 

Multi-context Plans as opposed to single context plans can be made of complete sites, trenches or individual features. In the United Kingdom, the scale of the plans is usually 1:20. They are linked to the site recording system by the inclusion of known grid points and height readings, taken with a dumpy level or a total station (see surveying). Excavation of a site by the removal of human made deposits in the reverse order they were created is the preferred method of excavation and is referred to as stratigraphic area excavation "in plan" as opposed to excavation "in section". Plan and section drawings have an interpretive function as well as being part of the recording system, because the draughts-person makes conscious decisions about what should be included or emphasised.

Archaeological plan topics

The grid 
It is common and good practice on excavations to lay out a grid of 5m squares so as to facilitate planning. This grid is marked out on-site with grid pegs that form the baselines for tapes and other planning tools to aid the drawing of plans.  It is also common practice that planning is done for each context on a separate piece of perma-trace that conforms to these 5m grid squares.  This is part of the single context recording system (see Fig 1.) The site grid should be tied into a national geomatic database such as the Ordnance survey

Planning drawing conventions 
Archaeological planners use various symbols to denote characteristics of features and contexts and while conventions vary depending on practitioner, the following are representative:

Pre-excavation and base plans 
On  sites with little stratigraphic depth, a pre-excavation multi-context plan is sometimes made of all visible features before any excavation is carried out.  This helps in planning strategy since problems of stratigraphy on rural sites are minimal as features often cut into the natural minimizing issues of inter-cutting features. Conversely, planning a multi-context urban site is difficult to achieve on a multi-context plan as the features and deposits when planned will obscure each other on the same planning sheet.

Critics of pre-excavation planning 
Pre-excavation plans have been critiqued as being of limited use on urban or deeply stratified sites and have also been attacked in professional archaeology where they have been described as a misused tool of the unscrupulous operators to give the impression the archaeological record for a given site has been dealt with adequately.

This critical  point of view contends, that  comparisons  between pre and post-excavation plans can demonstrate that a site has not been comprehensively excavated on the basis of a pre-ex plan alone.  In many cases there is a pronounced difference between the two phases of planning.  Although many features may be visible at ground level following machining, it is often the case that the true limits of features are not so initially discernible until the area of the feature is fully cleaned and subsequently excavated revealing further features and relationships lower in the sequence.

See also 

Archaeological context
Archaeological field survey
Archaeological illustration
Archaeological section
Cut (archaeology)
Excavation (archaeology)
Feature (archaeology)
Geomatics
Harris matrix
Single context recording
Site plan

References

Further reading 
 The MoLAS archaeological site manual MoLAS, London 1994. . Rb 128pp. bl/wh

Methods in archaeology
Infographics
Technical drawing